The discography of American hip hop recording artist Offset consists of one studio album, one collaborative album and twenty-four singles (including twenty-three as a featured artist).

In 2017, Offset released Without Warning, in collaboration with fellow Atlanta-based rapper 21 Savage and American record producer Metro Boomin. The album entered at number 4 on the US Billboard 200. The album spawned the single "Ric Flair Drip", which has been certified triple platinum by the RIAA.

Albums

Studio albums

Collaborative albums

Extended plays

Singles

As lead artist

As featured artist

Other charted songs

Other guest appearances

See also 

 Migos discography
 Quavo discography
 Takeoff discography

Notes

References

Discographies of American artists
Hip hop discographies